The Subprefecture of Ipiranga is one of 32 subprefectures of the city of São Paulo, Brazil.  It comprises three districts: Ipiranga, Cursino, and Sacomã. This subprefecture hosts the Ipiranga Museum and the Parque da Independência, where the independence of Brazil was proclaimed.

References

Subprefectures of São Paulo